Välbe is an Estonian surname. Notable people with the surname include:

Jüri Välbe (1911–1964), Estonian footballer
Katrin Välbe (1904–1981), Estonian actress
Urmas Välbe (born 1966), Estonian cross-country skier
Yelena Välbe (born 1968), Russian cross-country skier

Estonian-language surnames